Covers, Volume 2 is the 13th studio album by Filipino singer-actress Regine Velasquez, released on January 30, 2006, by Viva Records in the Philippines in CD format and in digital download. The album contains different music genres including jazz and blues which is new to Velasquez' repertoire. It is her third cover album from Viva after R2K (1999) and Covers, Vol. 1 (2004), and includes covers of songs by Al Green, Paul McCartney and Wings, Blondie and Alanis Morissette among others. The first single released is Hold Me In Your Arms originally done by the Southern Sons. The album was certified platinum a month after its release.

Background
Covers, Vol. 2 is her last album from Viva Records Corporation after eight years with five full-length studio albums, four movie soundtracks, one live album, one extended play, and two compilation albums. This album also marked for her 20th anniversary in Philippine showbiz.

Most of the songs were personally handpicked by Velasquez herself together with her sisters Cacai Velasquez-Mitra, also her manager and Diane Velasquez-Roque which is also her associate producer for this album. All of the international songs were presented with new arrangements in various musical genres. The album was produced by Velasquez with Raul Mitra and co-produced by South Border's Jay Durias. According to Velasquez it was her most ambitious album to date because of innovative arrangements done with the songs but less expensive project than its predecessor, Covers, Vol. 1.

Reviews

Covers, Vol. 2 received generally positive reviews from music critics. Edgar Cruz of Buzzstation from the Daily Tribune wrote that Velasquez did a good job with the album stating "she gives them her own twists, which invigorate the highly textured songs with a feel and flavor entirely its own." While Ruel J. Mendoza of Manila Standard gave the album a favorable review. He also praised the album's arrangers, producers and musicians for re-inventing the arrangements of the cover songs. Veronica R. Samio of Pilipino Star Ngayon appreciated the style that Velasquez did with the original songs like "Blue Suede Shoes" making it a bluesy improvisation and Paula Abdul's pop "Straight Up" to a jazz repertoire.

Track listing

Album credits
Personnel
Vic del Rosario, Jr. – executive producer
Vincent del Rosario – executive producer
Diane Velasquez-Roque – associate producer
Regine Velasquez-Alcasid – producer
Raul Mitra – producer, recording engineer
Jay Durias – producer
Voltaire Orpiano – recording engineer
Erik Payumo – recording engineer
Lani Sarong – production assistant
Sam S. Samson – graphic designer
Jun de Leon – photography
Aria Productions – management
Production
Regine Velasquez – vocals, background vocals
Arnie Mendaros – vocal arranger, background vocals (track 7)
Cacai Velasquez-Mitra – background vocals (track 2)
Boses-Marnie Jereza – background vocals (track 7)
Bubbles Ganotan – background vocals (track 7)
The Company – background vocals (track 11)
Babsie Molina – background vocals (track 15)
Sylvia Macaraeg – background vocals (track 15)
Raul Mitra – arranger (tracks 1, 9 and 12), mixer (tracks 1, 4, 5, 6, 7, 10, 11 and 13)
Jay Durias – arranger, mixer, co-producer (tracks 8 and 14), piano (track 8)
Noel Mendez – arranger (tracks 1, 5 and 13), guitars (tracks 1, 3, 5 and 13), acoustic guitar (tracks 2, 5 and 13)
Nino Regalado – arranger (tracks 2 and 6)
Monet Silvestre – arranger (track 3)
Cezar Aguas – arranger (track 4), guitars (track 4)
Soc Mina – arranger (track 7)
Ric Mercado – arranger (track 10), guitars (track 10)
Moy Ortiz – arranger (track 11), background vocal (track 15)
Mon Faustino – arranger (track 15)
Gerard Salonga – arranger (track 16)
Erik Payumo – mixer (track 16)
Bobby Rasco – bass (track 1)
Tots Tolentino – sax (track 1), flute (track 12)
Jopat Gragera – oboe (track 2)
Meong Pacana – bass (tracks 3, 4 and 13)
Liza Lopez – strings-cello (tracks 3 and 15)
Theodore Amper – strings-cello (tracks 9)
Proceso Yusi – strings-violin (tracks 3 and 15)
Antonio Bautista – strings-violin (tracks 3 and 15)
Macky Chua – strings-violin (track 9)
Karla Hotchkiss – strings-violin (track 9)
Marites Ibero – strings-viola (tracks 3 and 15)
Diane Acacio – strings-viola (track 9)
George San Jose – drums (track 4)
Mike Alba – percussion (track 5)
Tek Faustino – acoustic box (track 13)
Mel Villena – harmonica (track 13)
All songs are recorded and mixed at Dragonlair Studio (except when noted)
Tracks 8 and 14 are recorded and mixed at Kahlil's Playground
Track 16 is recorded and mixed at Global Content Center

References

See also
 Regine Velasquez discography
 List of best-selling albums in the Philippines

Regine Velasquez albums
2006 albums
Covers albums